Thitima Muangjan (born 13 April 1983) is a Thai athlete who specialises in the triple jump. She has won multiple medals at the regional level. She is the Thai record holder indoors and out. Her best international performance was a bronze medal at the 2010 Asian Games.

Competition record

Personal bests
Outdoor
Long jump – 6.35 (+0.3 m/s) (Vientiane 2009)
Triple jump – 14.08 (+0.5 m/s) (Vientiane 2009) NR
Indoor
Long jump – 6.18 (Hanoi 2009) NR
Triple jump – 13.78 (Hanoi 2009) NR

References

1983 births
Living people
Thitima Muangjan
Thitima Muangjan
Female triple jumpers
Athletes (track and field) at the 2010 Asian Games
Athletes (track and field) at the 2014 Asian Games
Asian Games medalists in athletics (track and field)
Thitima Muangjan
Southeast Asian Games medalists in athletics
Thitima Muangjan
Thitima Muangjan
Thitima Muangjan
Medalists at the 2010 Asian Games
Competitors at the 2007 Southeast Asian Games
Competitors at the 2009 Southeast Asian Games
Competitors at the 2011 Southeast Asian Games
Competitors at the 2013 Southeast Asian Games
Competitors at the 2007 Summer Universiade
Competitors at the 2009 Summer Universiade
Competitors at the 2011 Summer Universiade
Thitima Muangjan